"Let Love Lead the Way" is a song by English girl group the Spice Girls, released as one of the two songs picked as the lead single from their third studio album, Forever (2000). The single was released internationally as a double A-side single with "Holler". It peaked at number one on the UK Singles Chart, becoming the group's ninth number-one single.

Background
After releasing "Goodbye" as their first single without member Geri Halliwell, in 1998, the band took a break and only came back to a recording studio in mid-1999, when Rodney Jerkins signed up to give their then-upcoming new album a tougher sound. Jerkins said, "I went out to dinner with a couple of the Spice Girls about a month and a half ago and they told me that they want me to, you know, do some work on their album, so I'm planning on going to London at the end of January, early February to work on the album, so it should be cool. I'm ready for it, it will still have a pop appeal, but the beats will be a little harder." Later, in October 1999, Jerkins also said, "I did three songs with them, and everybody I've been playing them for can't believe it's the Spice Girls. I like to create for the artist on the spot. I knew I had to do the Spice Girls 10 months beforehand, but I didn't write one single lyric or do one track until I got to London. We started working on the songs the day I met them, because I wanted to get a vibe from them. We did the three songs in five days".

Release
In March 2000, BBC Radio announced that the first single from their forthcoming third album would be "Holler". However, in May, Melanie C told Heat magazine that the first single from the album would be a ballad titled "Let Love Lead the Way" and would be released in August. In July 2000, the girls said that the first single had not been chosen yet, and that they were still up for discussion which one will be the first single. Finally, in late July, Melanie C confirmed to T4 that their new single will be a double A-side of "Let Love Lead the Way" and "Holler", saying that the video for "Let Love Lead the Way" was filmed a week before. "Let Love Lead the Way" received its world premiere on the Malaysian radio station Hitz FM on 14 September. The single was released in the United Kingdom on 23 October 2000 as a CD and cassette single.

Composition

"Let Love Lead the Way" was written by the members of the group Victoria Beckham, Melanie Brown, Emma Bunton and Melanie Chisholm, along with Rodney Jerkins, LaShawn Daniels, Fred Jerkins III and Harvey Mason Jr., while production was handled by Jerkins and Mason Jr. "Let Love Lead the Way" is an inspirational pop song, with the girls singing words of wisdom to a girl. In the chorus, they sing, "Part of me laughs/Part of me cries/Part of me wants to question why [...] Just keep the faith/And let love lead the way." The song is widely believed to be written about Geri Halliwell.

Critical reception

The song received a mixed reception from music critics. Helen Marquis of Amazon.com called it an "instantly recognisable Spice ballad", while Sputnikmusic called it a "gorgeous ballad". The Bland Is Out There named it "a sweet and solid ballad". David Browne of Entertainment Weekly criticised the track, writing that it "could be sung by any urban radio girl group." Whitney Matheson of USA Today criticised the lyrics and wrote that "I've heard catchier jingles on feminine product commercials, although I must admit I'm impressed with the deeply imaginative third-person perspective". While reviewing their Greatest Hits album, Nick Levine of Digital Spy wrote that "Jerkins' slick, stuttering R&B numbers from the Forever album ('Holler', 'Let Love Lead The Way') fail to capitalise on the girls' very British sense of mischief."

Commercial performance
In the UK, on 24 October 2000, early sales figures reported that "Holler"/"Let Love Lead the Way" was set to debut at number one. It sold 31,000 copies during the first day on sale. On 29 October 2000, the song debuted at the top of the UK Singles Chart, becoming the first female group to have nine number one singles. The song became the 11th UK number-one single with Melanie Chisholm as a songwriter, making her the female artist with more number ones than any other in chart history. She held this record until Madonna surpassed it in 2006 with "Sorry". However, Mel C remains the only female performer to top the charts as a solo artist, as part of a duo, quartet and quintet. The single was released separately from "Holler" in Canada, but was also a success, reaching number five on the Canadian Singles Chart. In Australia, "Holler"/"Let Love Lead the Way" was a success, debuting and peaking at number two on the ARIA Charts, becoming their highest charting-single since 1998's "Viva Forever". In New Zealand, the song debuted at number 47 on the RIANZ chart, remaining for a further week at the position. Later, it jumped to number 36, also remaining for two weeks at the position. Finally, after a week at number 29, the song rose to number two, becoming its peak position and the band's 10th consecutive top-10 single.

Music video
The music video similar in concept to that of "Holler" where each of the girls portray one of the four elements. Though this time, Chisholm switches elements with Bunton, representing earth and wearing a green dress. She is shown reclining in a beautiful forest, underneath a large tree. Brown switches elements with Beckham and portrays the element air, dressed entirely in white and dancing in a white room with the canvas walls billowing outwards as if being blown by the wind, while white feathers continuously fall from the sky. Beckham is wearing a dark red dress, representing fire. She is slowly dancing in a barren desert at night, with bursts of fire flaring up behind her. Chisholm plays the part of water, dressed in predominantly blue clothes. She is standing on a blue platform as water cascades from the ceiling to the floor. Throughout the verses of the song, the girls sing in their own areas, before coming together in one of the rooms for the chorus. Towards the end of the song, each of the elements begin to mix, such as water falling down in the fiery desert and wind blowing through the forest. The four girls are then seen singing together in the desert where all the elements are present plus a shower of sparks behind the girls. The song finishes with a slow-motion shot of each of the girls in their own areas, and then a final shot of each of them together in the white room. Additional behind-the-scenes footage was shown on the Spice Girls' website at the time and on CD:UK.

Live performances

The four-piece group performed the song on Top of the Pops, CD:UK and National Lottery in 2000 for the promotion of the single. In 2007 and 2008, the Spice Girls performed the song again on their reunion tour, Return of the Spice Girls. Even though group member Geri Halliwell had returned to the group at this point, she did not take part in performing this song as with "Holler", which signaled her departure from the group in the concert's storyline (performing "Viva Forever" when Halliwell is leveled under the stage). Halliwell reunited with the group just as the song ends by rising from the ground.

During the Spice World - 2019 Tour, Halliwell took part in performing all three songs included from the Forever album - "Goodbye", "Holler" and "Let Love Lead the Way", singing Beckham's vocals.

Track listings
 UK CD 1/European Maxi CD 1/Australian Maxi CD 1/Malaysian Maxi CD/New Zealand Maxi CD 1/South African Maxi CD/Taiwanese Maxi CD 1/Thai Maxi CD / Australian CD 1
 "Holler"  – 3:55
 "Let Love Lead the Way"  – 4:15
 "Holler"  –  8:30

 UK CD 2/European Maxi CD 2/Australian Maxi CD 2/New Zealand Maxi CD 2/Taiwanese Maxi CD 2
 "Let Love Lead the Way"  – 4:15
 "Holler"  – 3:55
 "Holler"  – 7:10
 "Let Love Lead the Way" 
 "Let Love Lead the Way" 

 European/French CD Single
 "Holler"  – 3:55
 "Let Love Lead the Way"  – 4:15

 Japan CD Single
 "Holler"  – 3:55
 "Let Love Lead the Way"  – 4:15
 "Holler" 
 "Let Love Lead the Way" 

 Digital EP 
 "Holler"  – 3:55
 "Let Love Lead the Way"  – 4:15
 "Holler"  –  8:30
 "Holler"  - 7:16

Credits and personnel

Spice Girls – lyrics, vocals
Rodney Jerkins – lyrics, production, music, audio mixing
LaShawn Daniels – lyrics, vocal production
Fred Jerkins III – lyrics

Harvey Mason Jr – lyrics, production, music, Pro Tools
Brad Gilderman – recorder, audio mixing
Dave Russell – assistant
Ian Robertson – assistant

Published by Rodney Jerkins Productions/EMI Music Publishing Ltd., Fred Jerkins Music Publishing/Famous Music Corp, First Avenue Music Ltd., EMI Music Publishing (WP) Ltd.

Charts

Weekly charts

Year-end charts

Certifications

Release history

Notes

References

2000 songs
2000 singles
2000s ballads
Pop ballads
Song recordings produced by Rodney Jerkins
Songs written by Emma Bunton
Songs written by Fred Jerkins III
Songs written by Harvey Mason Jr.
Songs written by LaShawn Daniels
Songs written by Mel B
Songs written by Melanie C
Songs written by Rodney Jerkins
Songs written by Victoria Beckham
Spice Girls songs
Number-one singles in Scotland
UK Singles Chart number-one singles
Virgin Records singles
British contemporary R&B songs
Contemporary R&B ballads